Dharwad peda is an Indian sweet delicacy unique to the state of Karnataka, India. It derives its name from the city of Dharwad in Karnataka.This sweet's history is around 175 years old. Dharwad peda has been accorded Geographical Indication tag. Its GI tag number is 80.

History 

Dharwad peda was originally started by the Thakur family who had migrated from Unnao in Uttar Pradesh to Dharwad after plague broke out in Unnao in early 19th Century. Ram Ratan Singh Thakur, a first generation confectioner, started producing and selling pedas locally. Dharwad peda was prepared from the milk of Dharwadi buffaloes which are raised by the Gavali community in and around Dharwad. His grandson Babu Singh Thakur helped grow the family business further in their Line Bazaar store and the peda came to also be called locally as the "Line Bazaar Peda". The family closely guards the recipe of the Peda as a trade secret which has been passing down the lineage. Babusingh Thakur's single outlet store that was running for a few decades expanded later in Dharwad, Hubli, Bangalore, Belgaum and Haveri. In many other cities around India other confectioneries also sell Dharwad peda which is not connected to the Thakur family.

Ingredients 
The ingredients include milk, sugar and dharwadi buffalo milk.

Preparations 
It is made of milk which is heated and stirred continuously, with added flavor and sugar.  As a result, it can be considered a kind of condensed milk with flavors.

See also 
 Cuisine of Karnataka
 Big Mishra Pedha Pvt. Ltd.
 Byadagi chilli
 Mysore pak
 Udupi Mattu Gulla

References 

Karnataka cuisine
Indian desserts
Confectionery
Geographical indications in Karnataka
Dharwad district